Kinsey Lea Schofield (born March 27, 1985) is an American journalist. She was a contestant on E! Television's Party Monsters Cabo reality show. She parlayed her reality TV fame into television and digital presenting. She has been an entertainment reporter for RadarOnline.com, YoungHollywood.com  and E! Television. She covered the Jodi Arias murder trial for Phoenix's KPNX and nationally for Dr. Drew on Call, Nancy Grace, and Jane Velez-Mitchell on HLN. She has covered politics and pop culture in the newsrooms of KMAX, KSAZ, and KNXV. Schofield is credited for bringing to light a 1991 interview, where Bette Midler accuses Geraldo Rivera of drugging and groping her without her consent, at the height of the #MeToo movement.

Biography
Schofield was born in Austin, Texas to Michael and Kim Schofield. She is the oldest of three, with two brothers Reece and Greyson. The family moved around from Texas to Oklahoma and Arkansas before settling in Arizona. Due to the constant moving Schofield was home schooled from fourth grade through the end of high school. She credits home schooling for her creativity and social media following. Schofield has been featured on the January 2010 cover of Entrepreneur Magazine with the headline "Blog Like A Rockstar".  She graced the July 2013 So Scottsdale Magazine cover with the headline "Social Media Maven", and the March 2014 cover of Arizona Foothills Magazine with the headline, "Best of the Valley"

Career

Television
She was a contestant on the E! television reality show, Party Monsters Cabo, where she competed against eight other aspiring event planners. Schofield was the runner up in the event planning competition. She was a recurring guest on Fox News's Red Eye w/ Greg Gutfeld. Additional Fox News National appearances included Your World with Neil Cavuto, Fox & Friends, Happening Now,
and Strategy Room with Jill Dobson. Schofield was an entertainment reporter for YoungHollywood.com, RadarOnline.com, 1iota, Teen.com and Alloy Entertainment. Schofield is featured in numerous E! television pop culture comedy specials including Celebrity Oops: They Did It Again, Bigger Badder Celebrity Feuds, Attack of the Celebrity Bikinis, and Worst Thing I Ever Posted. She has appeared multiple times on Adam Carolla's Podcast filling in as the news girl. Schofield is likely most recognized for her Jodi Arias trial coverage on HLN's Nancy Grace, Dr. Drew on Call, and Jane Velez-Mitchell.

References

External links
 
 
 
 

1985 births
Living people
Journalists from Arizona
Journalists from Arkansas
Journalists from California
Journalists from Las Vegas
Journalists from Louisiana
Journalists from Oklahoma
Journalists from Texas
Participants in American reality television series
Writers from Los Angeles
Television anchors from Sacramento, California